Year 1016 (MXVI) was a leap year starting on Sunday (link will display the full calendar) of the Julian calendar.

Events 
 By place 

 Europe 
 March 25 – Battle of Nesjar (off the coast of Norway): Olaf Haraldsson is victorious over former co-regent Sweyn Haakonsson, confirming his status as king of Norway.
 April 23 – Æthelred the Unready, king of England, dies after a 38-year reign. He is succeeded by his son Edmund II "Ironside".
 Summer – Battle of Brentford (near London): Edmund II defeats the Danes under King Cnut the Great.
 July 6 – Battle of Pontlevoy: French forces of Fulk III and Herbert I defeat Odo II which determines the balance of power in the Loire Valley.
 October 18 – Battle of Assandun: Cnut the Great defeats Edmund II, leaving the latter as king of Wessex.
 November 30 – Edmund II dies and Cnut the Great takes control of the whole of the Kingdom of England.
 The Pisan and the Genoese republics launch a naval offensive against the Muslim strongholds of Sardinia, in particular Porto Torres, and defeat the fleet of the taifa king of Dénia, Mujāhid al-ʿĀmirī.
 Melus of Bari makes a second attempt against Byzantine-held Southern Italy. To support his cause, he hires Norman mercenaries, unwittingly triggering the rise of Norman rule over southern Italy. 
 Georgius Tzul, ruler of Khazaria, is captured by a combined Byzantine Empire–Kievan Rus' force, which effectively ends Khazaria's existence.

 Arabian Empire 
 January 7 – Fath al-Qal'i, governor of the Citadel of Aleppo, revolts against Emir Mansur ibn Lu'lu', forcing him to flee. Fath accepts an agreement with Salih ibn Mirdas and takes control of Aleppo.

 Asia 
 March 10 – Emperor Sanjō of Japan abdicates the throne after a 5-year reign. He is succeeded by his 7-year-old cousin Go-Ichijō as the 68th emperor of Japan. Fujiwara no Michinaga is appointed regent.
 Japanese poet Koshikibu no Naishi (lady-in-waiting to Dowager Empress Shōshi) and her husband Fujiwara no Kiminari (son of Michinaga) have a son, but the couple is not accepted because of the social gap between them.

Births 
 April 3 – Xing Zong, emperor of the Liao dynasty (d. 1055)
 June 9 – Deokjong, ruler of Goryeo (Korea) (d. 1034)
 July 25 – Casimir I the Restorer, duke of Poland (d. 1058)
 August 24 – Fujiwara no Genshi, Japanese empress (d. 1039)
 October 28 – Henry III, Holy Roman Emperor (d. 1056)
 Cao, empress and regent of Song dynasty China (d. 1079)
 Edward the Exile, son of Edmund II of England (d. 1057)
 Không Lộ, Vietnamese Zen master (approximate date)
 Minamoto no Tsunenobu, Japanese nobleman (d. 1097)
 Svein Knutsson, king of Norway (d. 1035)
 Yan Vyshatich, Kievan nobleman (d. 1106)

Deaths 
 April 23 – Æthelred the Unready, king of England
 May 22 – Jovan Vladimir, Serbian prince (b. 990)
 September 6 – Fujiwara no Bokushi, great-grandmother of the Emperor of Japan
 October 18 
 Ælfric of Hampshire, English nobleman
 Eadnoth the Younger, bishop of Dorchester in England
 Ulfcytel Snillingr, English nobleman
 November 30 – Edmund II "Ironside"), king of England
 Badis ibn Mansur, Muslim emir of the Zirid dynasty
 Henry II "the Good", count of Stade (b. 946)
 Liu Chenggui, official of Song dynasty China (b. 951)
 Simeon of Mantua, Armenian Benedictine monk
 Sulayman ibn al-Hakam, caliph of Córdoba
 Uhtred the Bold, English nobleman
 Wulfgar of Abingdon, English abbot

References

Sources